Reinhard Schau (8 September 1935 – 9 March 2019) was a German opera director and lecturer.

Life 

From 1964 to 1969, Schau was opera director at the Mecklenburgisches Staatstheater Schwerin, then opera director of the Theater Magdeburg until 1977.

In 1977, Schau was offered a position at the Hochschule für Musik Franz Liszt, Weimar, where he headed the opera school until 2001. In addition, he held a deputy professorship for scene studies and music theatre. In 1982, he received his doctorate from the Martin Luther University of Halle with a dissertation on singing training in the GDR. Between 1982 and 1988 he published articles in the professional journal Theater der Zeit. Schau initiated the foundation of the " Fördervereins der Musikhochschule Weimar" of the Weimar Academy of Music in 1991, which he subsequently also headed. 

After his retirement, the university appointed him as its honorary senator.

Stau died in Weimar at the age of 83.

Publications 
 Kinder des Südens. Szenen um Hugo Wolf. Hamburg 2003.
 Das Weimarer Belvedere. Eine Bildungsstätte zwischen Goethezeit und Gegenwart. Böhlau Verlag, Cologne, 2006.
 Das Musikgymnasium Schloss Belvedere in Weimar. Geschichte und Gegenwart. Böhlau Verlag, Cologne, 2010.
 Die Stiftung der Marie Seebach – Ein Altenheim für Bühnenkünstler. Since 1895 in Weimar. Böhlau Verlag, Cologne, 2015.

References

External links 
 

German opera directors
1935 births
2019 deaths
People from Ełk